Maipo Province is one of six provinces in the Santiago Metropolitan Region of central Chile. Its capital is San Bernardo.

Administration
As a province, Maipo is a second-level administrative division of Chile, governed by a provincial delegate who is appointed by the president.

Communes
The province is composed of four communes (Spanish: comunas), each governed by a municipality consisting of an alcalde and municipal council:
 Buin
 Paine
 San Bernardo, capital
 Calera de Tango

Geography and demography
According to the 2002 census, Maipo was the third most populous province in the region with a total population of 378,444. At that time, there were 336,198 people living in urban areas, 42,246 living in rural areas, 187,789 men, and 190,655 women.

Maipo Valley wine region

Maipo Valley is the closest Chilean wine region to Santiago, the capital city of Chile. It extends eastwards from the city to the Andes and westward to the coast, stretching south toward the towns and subzones of Padre Hurtado, Peñaflor, Talagante, Isla de Maipo and Melipilla.

The valley includes over 7,302 acres (2,955 ha) of vineyards, more than half of which are dedicated to producing Cabernet Sauvignon or Cabernet blends. It is a historic wine-producing region and the birthplace of the Chilean wine industry, with vines growing there for the past 150 years.

The Maipo Valley can be divided in three sub-regions: Alto Maipo, Central Maipo, and Pacific Maipo.

Alto Maipo
The Alto Maipo sub-region is located in the foothills of the Andes, rising from 400 m.a.s.l. to 800 m.a.s.l. (1,300 to 2,600 feet), and is strongly influenced by the mountainous climate. The mountains make the zone particularly good for viticulture because they produce a great variation in temperature between day and night. This is because the sun must first rise above the Argentinean side of the Andes before reaching the western Chilean slopes, creating cold mornings, and then sets on the western side, leading to hot, sunny afternoons. The climate, combined with the poor, porous and rocky soil, puts the vines under stress which in turn produces a characteristically bold, elegant Cabernet Sauvignon.

Central Maipo
The area surrounding the Maipo River is one of the oldest winemaking areas in Chile and was the first part of the Maipo Valley to be settled. Cabernet Sauvignon dominates production, but the region has also started producing Carmenere wines. Central Maipo is the warmest and driest of the three Maipo Valley sub-regions, with rocky alluvial soils and less rainfall than the Alto Maipo and Pacific Maipo, requiring drip irrigation. Vineyards are often planted along the Maipo River, an area known for its alluvial soils.

Pacific Maipo
Pacific Maipo is the youngest wine-producing area in the Maipo Valley and there are relatively few vineyards found in the vicinity of the Maipo River. Grapes grown in this region benefit from the coastal influence of the Pacific Ocean as well as the alluvial soils also found in the area. Red wines from Pacific Maipo have a refreshing, natural acidity from the influence of the ocean. The vineyards in this area tend to be tucked up against some of the smaller, low-lying hills that rise between the Andes and the Coastal Range so that they are protected from the harsh winds coming off the coast. Because of the region’s coastal influence, Pacific Maipo is also a popular place for experimentation with the country’s white varieties, most notably Sauvignon Blanc.

Grape distribution by varietal

 Climate:  Mediterranean, 315 mm (12.4 in) annual rainfall.
 Soils: Sandy and gravel to the east, more clay to the west.
 Primary grape varietals: Cabernet Sauvignon, Carmenere, and Syrah.

 Total Hectares planted: 12,955 ha (7,302 acres)

References

External links
 

Provinces of Chile
Provinces of Santiago Metropolitan Region